Chalker High School is a public high school in Southington Township, Trumbull County, Ohio.  It is the only high school in the Southington Local School District. Their mascot is the Wildcats, and compete as a member of the Ohio High School Athletic Association and is a member of the Northeastern Athletic Conference. The original Chalker High School Building was closed in 2011 and relocated at 2482 OH-534, Southington, OH 44470.

History
Chalker High School is named for Newton Chalker, an attorney who was born in Southington in 1842. Chalker created an endowment for the high school when schools in the township agreed to consolidate smaller schools in a central location. The town agreed to consolidation, and the original campus was completed in 1907, consisting of the Chalker High School building and a smaller elementary school. Newton Chalker agreed to pay for Chalker High school, as long as the townspeople would pay for the elementary school building, which was not nearly as grand, totaling $6000 as compared to the Chalker Building's $20,000. The high school was constructed in the Neoclassical Revival architectural style, including fluted columns and a pedimented gable. The building was listed on the National Register of Historic Places on February 4, 2011.

Athletics
Chalker High School currently offers:
 Baseball
 Bowling
 Basketball
 Cross country
 Cheerleading
 Drone Racing
Football (club sport)
 Golf
 Softball
 Track and field
 Volleyball
Wrestling

Basketball players with 1000+ point in their careers 
Bold denotes that player is still attending Chalker

Boys:

 Trey Tietz - 1428
 Jordan Kellar - 1388
 David Motz - 1300
 Rob Gilanyi - 1207
 Eric Wilson - 1165
 Tommy Hall - 1112
 Jacob Zolina - 1090
 Travis Wilcox - 1076
 Brain Muckle - 1034
 Bill Hurd - 1025
 James Stull - 1019

Girls:

 Courtney Warnick - 1463
 Holly Householder - 1459
 Angie Gideon - 1141
 Rebecca Derr - 1022

Best Seasons by Sport 
Boys Basketball: 1977-78 (22-2), 1978-79 (20-2), 1989-90 (16-7), 1994-95 (19-5), 1995-96 (22-3), 1999-00 (18-6), 2002-03 (19-4), 2007-08 (18-5), 2013-14 (16-8)

Girls Basketball: 2022-23 (15-7)

Bowling: 2019-20 (11-4)

Football: 1980-1981 (9-1), 2000-2001 (7-3), 2001-2002 (6-4), 2003-2004 (8-2), 2018-2019, (6-4)

Conference/League/District Champions by Sport 
Baseball - 1998, 1999, 2000 (League Champions) 1998, 1999, 2000 (District Champions) 1999, 2000 (Regional Champions)

Boys Basketball - 1966 (NEO Champion) 1978, 1979, 1980, 1982, 1983, 1993, 1994, 1995, 1996, 2000, 2004 (League Champions) 1978, 1990, 1995, 1996, 2000 (District Champions)

Girls Basketball - 1981, 1982, 1991, 1992, 1993, 1994, 1995, 1999, 2010, 2023 (League Champions) 1991, 1992 (District Champions)

Cross Country - 1960 (League Champions)

Football - 1980 (GRC Champions) 2009 (NAC Champions) 2001, 2013 (Playoff Berths)

Golf - 1965, 1972, 1982, 1983, 1996, (League Champions)

Softball - 1985, 1991, 1992, 1993, 1994, 1995, 1996, 1998, 1999, 2000 (League Champions) 1992, 1993, 1998, 2000, 2001 (District Champions) 1998 (Regional Champions) 1998 (State Champions)

Track and Field - 1942, 1975 (League Champions)

Wrestling - 2022 (District Champions) 2022, 2023 (State Runner-up)

Ohio High School Athletic Association State Championships 

 Girls Softball – 1998

Organizations

Beta Club 
Beta club is the school's academic honors program that heavily emphasizes community service. Students must maintain a 3.0 grade point average and fulfill 10 hours of community service to maintain membership. It is affiliated with the National Beta Club organization.

National Honor Society 
The school's chapter of the National Honor Society recognizes students who excel in the program's main criteria of scholarship, service, leadership, and character.

Notable alumni

 Rick Badanjek –  former NFL player
 Chad Petty - former MLB player

References

External links
District website

High schools in Trumbull County, Ohio
Public high schools in Ohio